The Chee Kung Tong, or Gee Kung Tong, was a Chinese secret society established in 1880 and holds an active presence still. In earlier years, the society has also been recognized as the "Chinese Masons" and has been identified under various names such as Hongmen, Hongshuntang, and Yixingtang. The fraternity founded its headquarters in San Francisco in the United States.

The Chee Kung Tong was established as an all-male fraternity with the purpose of promoting Chinese values, customs, and the ideals of democracy, within a tight-knit network of brotherhood that has ties dating back over three hundred years prior in China. The society is considered the oldest Chinese-rooted organization established in the United States.

History 

The Chee Kung Tong are most recognized for their political support of Dr. Sun Yat-Sen, who is considered the founding father of the Republic of China. Dr. Sun Yat-Sen began a campaign to overthrow the Manchu rulers of the Qing Dynasty. In 1904, a meeting took place between The Chee Kung Tong and Dr. Sun Yat-Sen in Hawaii. The purpose of the meeting was to rally nationalist support for a future revolution that would take place in 1911.The society also assisted in Dr. Sun Yat-Sen's campaign throughout the United States.

See also
 China Zhi Gong Party
 For Public Good Party

References 

1880 establishments
Chinese-American culture in San Francisco